Pacifier (re-released as The Pacifier Album) is the fifth studio album released by New Zealand band, Shihad.

At the time of the release they were performing under the name Pacifier due to controversy surrounding the similarity of the word Shihad to jihad. The name Pacifier was derived from the single of the same name from their previous album, The General Electric.

Released in 2002, songs such as "Run" and "Bullitproof" went on to become hit singles. "Bullitproof" peaked at #27 on the Billboard Mainstream Rock Tracks, and #37 on the Billboard Modern Rock Tracks. However, it still failed to break the band into the United States. "Everything" was used in the closing credits of the 2002 film Swimfan.

The band, and lead singer Jon Toogood especially, have since expressed displeasure with the album, calling it "overproduced", and "bullshit – that would've been the wrong album to be big on." In 2023 bassist Karl Kippenberger said, "I love those songs. I love them being part of our history...It’s OK to fall in and out of love with your own stuff, you know?"

This album features Scott Weiland (Stone Temple Pilots and Velvet Revolver) and DJ Lethal (Limp Bizkit and House of Pain) on the track "Coming Down".

This double Platinum selling album was produced by Josh Abraham, of Thirty Seconds to Mars/Michelle Branch/Weezer fame.

One version of this album included the "Weapons of Mass Destruction" bonus disc and yet another version contained a bonus disc featuring live acoustic tracks from the "Helen Young Sessions".

The Pacifier Album re-release

In 2023 the album was re-released on vinyl. For this edition the band name is restored to Shihad and the album is retitled The Pacifier Album.

Track listing

Bonus discs

Weapons of Mass Destruction

Helen Young Sessions
 "Run" – 3:57
 "Weight of the World" – 4:13
 "Coming Down" – 4:02
 "Brightest Star" – 2:53
 "Walls" – 4:08
 "Home" – 3:42

Credits 
 All songs by: Pacifier (except "Bullitproof" written by Pacifier and Dave Bassett)
 Produced by: Josh Abraham
 Recorded and Mixed by: Ryan Williams, with Andy Wallace on "Comfort Me", "Everything", "Bullitproof"
 Mastered by: Tom Baker

Certifications

References

Shihad albums
2002 albums
Albums produced by Josh Abraham